Charsadda District is a district in Peshawar Division of Khyber Pakhtunkhwa province in Pakistan. Prior to its establishment as a separate district in 1998, it was a tehsil within Peshawar District. Pashtuns make up majority of the population of the district. District headquarter is town of Charsadda, which was part of the Peshawar ex-metropolitan region.

Overview and history

The district lies between 34-03' and 34-38' north latitudes and 71-28' and 71-53' east longitudes. Charsadda is located in the west of the Khyber Pakhtunkhwa and is bounded by Malakand District to the north, Mardan district to the east, Nowshera and Peshawar districts to the south and Mohmand district to the west. The district covers an area of 996 square kilometers.

Charsadda was once part of the kingdom of Gandhara, however around 516 BC Gandhara became part of the seventh satrapy or province of the Achaemenid Empire and paid tribute to Darius the Great of Persia, until its overthrow by Alexander the Great in the 4th century BC.

After the death of Alexander in 323 BC the Indian Emperor Chandragupta Maurya rose to power and brought Gandhara under his sway. According to a popular tradition, Emperor Ashoka built one of his stupas there.

A Brahminical temple to the east and a monastery to the north which according to Buddhist legends was the place where Buddha preached the Law. The name Gandhara disappeared after Mahmud of Ghazni conquered the area and converted it to Islam in 1026.

Bactrian Greeks
This area was also ruled by the Bactrian Greeks between 250–125 BC which was succeeded by the Indo-Greek Kingdom who ruled until 10 AD.

Shabqadar
A fort was built here by the Sikhs called Sharkargarh. The town was burnt by Mohmands in 1897 It has since been rebuilt.

Bibi Syeda Dheri

Believed to be the site of the stupa erected to commemorate the conversion by Buddha of goddess Hariti who used to devour children of the locality. There is also a shrine of a lady saint Bibi Syeda.

Shar-i-Napursan

Shar-i-Napursan is an archaeological site in Charsadda tehsil near the village Rajjar Excavations have unearthed two distinct settlements of the Buddhist period and two of the Muslim period. Coins of Manander, Hermaeous and Kanishka have been unearthed.

Palatu Dheri

Palatu Dheri is another archaeological site near Charsadda tehsil. A mile from Shar-i-Napursan A mound which contains the remains of a stupa, which according to Hieun Tsiang, was built by one Deven and some coins which connect them both to the first century AD have been unearthed Other finds include the image of the goddess Kalika-devi. Three inscribed jars, which were presented by some laymen to "the Community of the Four Quarters", are now in the Peshawar Museum.

Charsadda

The city of Charsadda originally known as Pushkalavati is first mentioned in the Hindu epic story the Ramayana.

Bala Hisar of Charsadda

Bala Hisar was excavated twice by the head of the Archaeological Survey of India, Sir John Marshall, in 1902 and by Sir Mortimer Wheeler in 1958. According to South Asian Archaeology Research Group of Bradford University Wheeler suggested that Bala Hisar "was founded by the Persians in the sixth century BC as a colony guarding the eastern edge of their empire".

Demographics 
At the time of the 2017 census the district had a population of 1,610,960, of which 817,651 were males and 793,298 females. Rural population was 1,340,756 (83.23%) while the urban population was 270,204 (16.77%). The literacy rate was 50.72% - the male literacy rate was 66.17% while the female literacy rate was 35.04%. 873 people in the district were from religious minorities, mainly Christians. Pashto was the predominant language, spoken by 99.13% of the population.

The population of the district over the years is shown in the table below.

Administration
The district is administratively subdivided into 3 Tehsils comprising a total of 58 Union Councils:

National Assembly Seats 
The district is represented in the National Assembly by two MNAs who represent the following constituencies:

Provincial Assembly Seats 
The district is represented in the Provincial Assembly by five MPAs who represent the following constituencies:

Towns and villages
 
 
 Sardheri
 Sukar
 (Matta Mughal Khel)

See also
 Bacha Khan
 Akbar Khan (Pakistani general)

References

Bibliography 

 
History of Pakistan
Districts of Khyber Pakhtunkhwa